Cinnamon Hill is a great house and sugar plantation associated with the Cornwall plantation located in St James Parish, Jamaica. It is close to Rose Hall and overlooks the sea. The House was started by Samuel Barrett junior (d. 1760), who had bought the Cornwall Estate. However he died and the work was continued by his son Edward Barrett (1734 - 1798). Edward also completed the Cinnamon Hill sugar works in 1784.

The plantation is also said to be haunted by the White Witch.  The namesake of a golf course on the estate grounds.

The country music musician Johnny Cash owned the property for many years.

References

Great Houses in Jamaica